Alberto Bovone (11 June 1922 – 17 April 1998) was an Italian Cardinal of the Catholic Church. He served as Prefect of the Congregation for the Causes of Saints from 1995 until his death, and was elevated to the cardinalate in 1998.

Alberto Bovone was born in Frugarolo, and attended the seminary in Alessandria. Ordained to the priesthood on 26 May 1945, he then did pastoral work for a year before continuing his studies from 1946 until 1951 at the University of Turin and the Pontifical University of St. Thomas Aquinas (Angelicum) in Rome (where he obtained his doctorate in canon law). Bovone entered the Roman Curia as an official of the Congregation for the Council in October 1951, and was later made Undersecretary of the Congregation for the Doctrine of the Faith on 21 May 1973.

Pope John Paul II named him Titular Archbishop of Caesarea in Numidia on 5 April 1984 and Secretary of the Congregation for the Doctrine of the Faith three days later, on 8 April. Bovone received his episcopal consecration on the following 12 May from Cardinal Joseph Ratzinger, with Bishop Ferdinando Maggioni and Archbishop Luigi Dadaglio serving as co-consecrators. Bovone was the first person ordained as a Bishop by Ratzinger, who would become Pope Benedict XVI.

As Secretary of the Doctrine of the Faith, he was the second-highest official of that dicastery, under Cardinal Ratzinger. In 1987, he helped write the instruction Donum Vitae on the respect for human life.

Bovone was later appointed to head the Congregation for the Causes of the Saints on 13 June 1995. As he had yet to be raised to the College of Cardinals, he only held the title of Pro-Prefect of the congregation, until John Paul II created him Cardinal- Deacon of Ognissanti in Via Appia Nuova in the consistory of 21 February 1998, and Bovone became full Prefect of the Causes of the Saints two days later, on 23 February.

The Cardinal died in Rome two months later, at the age of 75. He is buried in his family's plot in Frugarolo.

External links
Cardinals of the Holy Roman Church
Catholic-Hierarchy
John Paul II's Homily at Cardinal Bovone's Funeral Mass

1922 births
1998 deaths
20th-century Italian cardinals
20th-century Italian Roman Catholic archbishops
Members of the Congregation for the Doctrine of the Faith
Members of the Congregation for the Causes of Saints
Cardinals created by Pope John Paul II
People from Frugarolo